Butt is a German and an English surname whose origins lie in the South West peninsula region of England.

Etymology 
The surname Butt or Butts is said to be derived from the French word "but" which is a noun meaning "target". The English name is derived from the Middle English word "but", a noun meaning a mark for archery, a target or goal, or someone's rear end. The name may derive from butt, a strip of ploughland shorter than the average length of one furlong.

History 
Anglo-Norman names are characterised by a multitude of spelling variations. When the Normans became the ruling people of England in the 11th century, they introduced a new language into a society where the main languages of Old and later Middle English had no definite spelling rules. These languages were more often spoken than written, so they blended freely with one another. Contributing to this mixing of tongues was the fact that medieval scribes spelled words according to sound, ensuring that a person's name would appear differently in nearly every document in which it was recorded. The name has been spelled Butt, But, Butte and others.

England
The surname can also be found in England where it is again of patronymic origin, meaning "son of Butt". First found in Middlesex where they were anciently seated, and were granted lands by William the Conqueror, and recorded in the Domesday Book compiled in 1086. An early reference to this surname in 1200 England, William de Butte is listed in Oseney. From the archery-related meaning, the surname Butt in England was originally used to describe somebody who either lived near archery butts, or someone who was actually an archer.  The name has been particularly popular in Devon and Cornwall since the 17th century, with a number of variants from the same origin including Butts, and two names meaning "Son of Butt": Butson and Butting.

Migration to Canada

For many English families, the political and religious disarray that plagued their homeland made the frontiers of the New World an attractive prospect. Thousands migrated, aboard cramped disease-ridden ships. They arrived sick, poor and hungry, but were welcomed in many cases with far greater opportunity than at home in England. Many of these hardy settlers went on to make important contributions to the emerging nations in which they landed. Among early immigrants bearing the name Butt or a variant listed above were, Roger Butt who settled in Carbonear, Newfoundland, in 1675, John Butt who settled in Conception Bay, Newfoundland, in 1706 and Joseph Butt settled in Crocker's Cove, Newfoundland, in the same year.

France
The Butt family is claimed to be originally from the village named But in Normandy, France and is patronymic in origin.

Germany
An early reference to a related surname dates back to 1266 where Conrad Dictus Butze is registered in Freiburg, Germany.

Notable people with the surname Butt

Alfred Butt, British theatre entrepreneur, Conservative politician and racehorse owner
Major Archibald Butt, military aide to U.S. presidents Theodore Roosevelt and William Howard Taft
Anthony Butt, New Zealand jockey
Brent Butt, Canadian stand-up comedian, actor and writer
Charles Butt, American grocer, son of Howard Butt
Clara Butt, English contralto
Cyrus M. Butt, American politician
David Butt Phillip, British operatic tenor
Dudley Butt, Manx politician
Gavin Butt, British art historian
Ghulam Mohammad Baksh Butt, Pakistani wrestler known as "The Great Gama"
Gizz Butt, British musician
Hans-Jörg Butt, German goalkeeper
Harry Butt, English cricketer
Howard Edward Butt Sr., American founder of H-E-B grocery chain
Hugh Butt, American physician
Isaac Butt, an Irish leader of the Home Rule League
Jake Butt, an American football tight end for the Denver Broncos
John Butt (sport shooter), English sports shooter
Len Butt (footballer born 1893), English footballer with Southampton and Bournemouth
Len Butt (footballer born 1910), English footballer with Huddersfield Town and Blackburn Rovers
Maggie Butt, British poet
Martha Haines Butt (1833–1871), American author, suffragist
Miriam Butt, German linguist
Nicky Butt, English footballer
Osman Khalid Butt, Pakistani actor
Peter Butt, Australian filmmaker
Ray Butt, British film and television producer
Raymond Butt, British schoolteacher
Salman Butt, Pakistani cricketer
Simon Butt, British diplomat
Sonya Butt, a female S.O.E. agent during the Second World War
Tameka Butt, Australian association footballer
Tom Butt, American politician in California
Wilfrid Butt, British endocrinologist
William Butt, American politician in Georgia

See also
But (surname)
Butts (surname)

References 

Surnames